The 1990 ATP Tour World Championships, also known as the 1990 IBM ATP Tour World Championships for sponsorship reasons, was a men's tennis tournament played on indoor carpet courts in Frankfurt, Germany. It was the 21st edition of the tournament and was held between 13–18 November 1990. Andre Agassi won the singles title.

Finals

Singles

 Andre Agassi defeated  Stefan Edberg, 5–7, 7–6(7–5), 7–5, 6–2

Doubles

 Guy Forget /  Jakob Hlasek defeated  Sergio Casal /  Emilio Sánchez 6–4, 7–6(7–5), 5–7, 6–4

References

 
Tennis tournaments in Germany
ATP Finals
Tennis tournaments in Australia
ATP Tour World Championships
Sports competitions in Frankfurt
ATP Tour World Championships
Tennis in Queensland
Atp Tour World Championships
Atp Tour World Championships, 1990